Preakness Valley Park and Golf Course is located in Wayne Township and Totowa Borough, New Jersey, United States, along Totowa Road (County Road 644) and Riverview Drive (County Road 640). Of the total 377 acres in the park, 298 acres are located in Wayne and 79 are located in Totowa. The park contains a Golf Course, which is a public 36 hole course. Made public in 1931, this full service course is considered the first public golf course in Passaic County. It has a clubhouse, caddy house, practice facilities, and on site maintenance facilities.

Also located on the park is Dey Mansion, a historical site famous for being George Washington's headquarters twice during the American Revolutionary War. The mansion was constructed around 1770, and has been county owned since 1930. NJ Transit Bus Route 197 provides service to this park.

References

External links
 

Golf clubs and courses in New Jersey
Buildings and structures in Passaic County, New Jersey
Tourist attractions in Passaic County, New Jersey
Sports in Passaic County, New Jersey
Wayne, New Jersey